No Money Down may refer to:

Music
"No Money Down" (Lou Reed song), 1986
 "No Money Down" (Chuck Berry song), recorded in 1955
 No Money Down: Greatest Hits, Volume 1, compilation album featuring John Sinclair (poet)
 "No Money Down" by Jerry Butler, track on compilation album Strictly Breaks Volume 11
 "No Money Down", track on 1996 album Smile! by The Remo Four

Other uses
 No Money Down Cultural Society at The Khyber arts centre, Halifax, Nova Scotia, Canada
 "No Money Down", 1997 episode of High Incident TV series 
 "No Money Down", 1995 episode of Grace Under Fire TV series

See also
"A No Money Down", song by Scream on 1991 compilation album It's Your Choice
Subprime mortgage crisis